The 1998–99 season was the 56th season in the existence of Nantes Atlantique and the club's 37th consecutive season in the top flight of French football.

Season summary
Nantes Atlantique competed in the French Division 1, the Coupe de France, and the Coupe de la Ligue, Trophée des Champions.

The 1998–99 season saw Nantes win their second Coupe de France title, and first in twenty years, qualifying for the following season's Trophée des Champions and UEFA Cup.

Squad

Source:

Overall record

Competitions

French Division 1

League table

Results summary

Results by round

Coupe de France

Coupe de la Ligue

References

FC Nantes seasons
Nantes